Rough Trade Sampler 02 International Edition is a compilation released in late 2005 to promote new material from the label's artists. It was released in CD format.

Track list 

 "Power Out" – 5:12 (Arcade Fire)
 "16 Military Wives" – 4:46 (The Decemberists)
 "Ring a Ding Ding" – 1:38 (The Brakes)
 "Fools Life" – 2:27 (Dr. Dog)
 "Frequency" – 4:41 (Super Furry Animals)
 "Out of Nowhere" – 2:53 (Delays)
 "Nothing Brings Me Down" – 3:57 (Emiliana Torrini)
 "Decisions, Decisions" – 3:07 (Nobody + Mystic Chords of Memory)
 "Francesca's Party" – 3:12 (Baxter Dury)
 "House Where We Live" – 4:22 (The Veils)
 "Tiny Cities Made of Ash" – 3:14 (Sun Kil Moon)
 "I Wish You Well" – 4:20 (Cara Dillon)
 "Don't Come Running" – 3:28 (Hal)
 "Their Way" – 3:08 (Littl'ans)
 "Throw It on a Fire" – 4:48 (Bell Orchestra)
 "Topknot" (Mia Mix) – 3:11 (Cornershop)

2005 compilation albums
Indie rock compilation albums
Rough Trade Records compilation albums
Record label compilation albums